{{Infobox football biography
| name = Hassani Dotson
| image = Hassani Dotson - - MNUFC - Minnesota United Loons - Allianz Field - St. Paul Minnesota (48259066957) (cropped).jpg
| caption = Dotson with Minnesota United in 2019
| fullname = Hassani Dotson Stephenson| birth_date = 
| birth_place = Seattle, Washington, United States
| height = 
| currentclub = Minnesota United
| clubnumber = 31
| position = Midfielder
| youthyears1 = 2007–2009
| youthclubs1 = Crossfire Academy
| youthyears2 = 2009–2015
| youthclubs2 = Washington Premier
| collegeyears1 = 2015–2018
| college1 = Oregon State Beavers
| collegecaps1 = 72
| collegegoals1 = 5
| years1 = 2016
| clubs1 = Washington Crossfire
| caps1 = 6
| goals1 = 0
| years2 = 2017–2018
| clubs2 = Lane United
| caps2 = 9
| goals2 = 0
| years3 = 2019–
| clubs3 = Minnesota United
| caps3 = 81
| goals3 = 8
| nationalyears1 = 2019–2021
| nationalteam1 = United States U23
| nationalcaps1 = 7
| nationalgoals1 = 2
| pcupdate = March 18, 2023
| ntupdate = March 21, 2021
}}Hassani Dotson Stephenson''' (born August 6, 1997) is an American professional soccer player who plays as a midfielder for Major League Soccer club Minnesota United.

Early career
Dotson attended Oregon State University, where he played college soccer for four years from 2015 to 2018, making 72 appearances, scoring five goals and tallying three assists. In his senior year he was named to the United Soccer Coaches Second Team of the All-Far West Region, made the Second Team of the All-Pac-12 Conference, and received a Pac-12 Conference Academic Honorable Mention.

While in college, Dotson also played in the Premier Development League with Washington Crossfire and Lane United FC.

Club career
On January 11, 2019, Dotson was drafted 31st overall in the 2019 MLS SuperDraft by Minnesota United. He signed with Minnesota on February 16, 2019, made his professional debut on March 2 that year against the Vancouver Whitecaps, and scored his first goal on June 2 against Philadelphia.

In June 2021, Dotson signed a three-year contract with Minnesota United.

International career
Dotson was a member of the United States under-23 team in 2019, playing in several friendlies.
 
In 2020, he was named to the United States under-23 roster for the 2020 CONCACAF Men's Olympic Qualifying Championship, although all games were postponed just before they were to begin in March 2020 because of the COVID-19 pandemic. When the qualifiers resumed in March 2021, he was again on the team, starting in the first game.

Personal life
Dotson is engaged to Croatian Petra Vuckovic, who he met while in college. He proposed to her on the field following a game, a moment widely shared on social media. Together the couple have a daughter Gia.

Career statistics

Club

References

External links
 

1997 births
Living people
American soccer players
Association football midfielders
Lane United FC players
Major League Soccer players
Minnesota United FC draft picks
Minnesota United FC players
Oregon State Beavers men's soccer players
People from Federal Way, Washington
Soccer players from Washington (state)
Sportspeople from King County, Washington
USL League Two players
United States men's under-23 international soccer players